Grand Street Media is an independent video production company located in the Flatiron district of New York City, United States. The company was founded in 2002. They have produced content for Maxim Magazine's Maximum Warrior show, The Doe Fund, and New York City mayoral candidate George T. McDonald. The company was founded in 2002 by Lowell Freedman and Jesse Guma.

Selected productions
Below is a select list of audio, film, television and online video projects in which Grand Street Media has been involved. Grand Street Media provides on-site production as well as post-production.

Video

References

External links
 Grand Street Media Official Site

Film production companies of the United States
Television production companies of the United States
Companies based in New York City